Leiosyrinx liphaima is a species of sea snail, a marine gastropod mollusk in the family Raphitomidae.

Description
The length of the shell attains 30.2 mm.

Distribution
This marine species was found in deep water in the Coral Sea.

References

 Bouchet, P. & Sysoev, A., 2001. Typhlosyrinx-like tropical deep-water turriform gastropods (Mollusca, Gastropoda, Conoidea). Journal of Natural History 35: 1693-1715

External links
 
 Intergovernmental Oceanographic Commission (IOC) of UNESCO. The Ocean Biogeographic Information System (OBIS)

liphaima
Gastropods described in 2001